Gwangju Catholic University is a Catholic university located in Naju (near Gwangju), South Korea.

References

External links
Gwangju Catholic University

Naju
Catholic universities and colleges in South Korea
Universities and colleges in South Jeolla Province
Educational institutions established in 1962
1962 establishments in South Korea